Miss Congeniality 2: Armed and Fabulous (also known as simply Miss Congeniality 2) is a 2005 American female buddy action comedy film directed by John Pasquin, written and co-produced by Marc Lawrence, and co-produced by and starring Sandra Bullock in the title role with Regina King, Enrique Murciano, William Shatner, Ernie Hudson, Heather Burns, Diedrich Bader, and Treat Williams. It is the sequel to the 2000 film Miss Congeniality.

Miss Congeniality 2: Armed and Fabulous was released by Warner Bros. Pictures on March 24, 2005 and grossed over $101 million worldwide, and received negative reviews from critics.

Plot
Several weeks after the events of the first film, in which FBI agent Gracie Hart infiltrated the Miss United States beauty pageant, her new-found fame results in her cover being blown while she is trying to prevent a bank heist.

To capitalize on Gracie's publicity the FBI decide to make her the new "face" of the bureau. After being dumped by her boyfriend, fellow agent Eric Matthews (who gets relocated to Miami), Gracie agrees to the reassignment.

When FBI agent Sam Fuller gets relocated to New York City from Chicago, Gracie doesn't take to her at all. The feeling seems to be mutual as the FBI eventually makes Sam Gracie's bodyguard, much to Sam's disgust.

Ten months later, Gracie begins appearing on morning television shows, such as Live with Regis and Kelly, The Oprah Winfrey Show and The Food Channel, giving out fashion advice and promoting her book.

However, when Gracie's friends, Cheryl Fraser (the current Miss United States) and Stan Fields, are kidnapped in Las Vegas, she goes undercover to try to rescue them, accompanied by Sam who is following up on her own lead after video footage of the abduction suggests that Fields was the target rather than Cheryl. This puts Gracie at odds with the FBI, who are unwilling to lose their mascot and are unsure if she's still up to the task.

The kidnappers move Cheryl and Stan to the ship at the Treasure Island Hotel and Casino which they plan to sink. Soon afterwards, Gracie, Sam and Joel (Gracie's new stylist) arrive at the Oasis Drag club where they end up singing Tina Turner songs and are given Cheryl and Stan's location by a contestant dressed as Dolly Parton. It is then up to Gracie to save the day once more, this time with the help of agent Sam.

Cast
 Sandra Bullock as Gracie Hart
 Regina King as Sam Fuller
 Enrique Murciano as Jeff Foreman
 William Shatner as Stan Fields
 Ernie Hudson as Harry McDonald
 Heather Burns as Cheryl Frasier (Miss United States)
 Diedrich Bader as Joel
 Vic Chao as Agent Hills
 Treat Williams as Walter Collins
 John DiResta as Agent Clonsky
 Abraham Benrubi as Lou Steele
 Nick Offerman as Karl Steele
 Eileen Brennan as Carol Fields
 Stephen Tobolowsky as Tom Abernathy
 Elisabeth Röhm as Janet
 Leslie Grossman as Pam
 Lusia Strus as Janine
 Adam LeFevre as Bartender
 Megan Cavanagh as Shirley
 Molly Gottlieb as Priscilla
 Dolly Parton as herself
 Christopher Ford as Jason
 Regis Philbin as himself
 Joy Philbin as herself
 Octavia Spencer as Octavia
  Ross Adam as Brian Cosford

Production
Sandra Bullock and writer Marc Lawrence initially had no plans for a sequel. While working on Two Weeks Notice, Bullock and Lawrence joked about ideas for a Miss Congeniality sequel, some of which "weren't that far-fetched" according to Bullock. Las Vegas was featured in an early version of the first film, but was ultimately written out of the script. A five-week shoot in southern Nevada began on April 12, 2004. Approximately half of the film's scenes were scheduled to be shot in Las Vegas.

Major filming locations included the Treasure Island and Venetian resorts. Scenes shot at Treasure Island included its Sirens of TI pirate show, which had never been featured in a film before and was closed to the public for filming. Other filming locations included the Welcome to Fabulous Las Vegas sign and the Klondike Hotel and Casino. In May 2004, filming took place at the Lloyd D. George Federal District Courthouse, which served as FBI headquarters within the film. Filming in Las Vegas concluded in mid-May 2004, and moved to Los Angeles for six weeks of shooting, followed by a brief shoot in New York. Bullock also produced the film, and said, "It does make for a schizophrenic experience. There are times when I'd rather be performing."

Bullock commented during the film's promotion on the type of story she wanted to tell:
I want women to be able to do the same thing that men get to do in comedies and say, 'That's a comedy.' Why does it always have to be a romantic comedy? Why does the girl have to end up with the guy? Why can't it be a buddy film?

Reception

Box office
The film grossed $101 million worldwide.

Critical response
The film received negative reviews from critics. On Rotten Tomatoes it has an approval rating of 15% based on 147 reviews. The critical consensus reads: "Sandra Bullock is still as appealing as ever; too bad the movie is not pageant material." On Metacritic the film has a score of 34 out of 100, based on reviews from 33 critics, indicating "generally unfavorable reviews". Audiences surveyed by CinemaScore gave the film a grade B.

Robert Koehler of Variety called the film "Lame and inoffensive". Roger Ebert for the Chicago Sun-Times calls the sequel "doubly unnecessary" and says "there is no good reason to go and actually see it."

See also
 List of films set in Las Vegas

References

External links

 
 
 
 
 

2005 films
2005 action comedy films
2000s buddy cop films
2000s police comedy films
2005 comedy films
American action comedy films
American female buddy films
American sequel films
Buddy comedy films
Castle Rock Entertainment films
2000s English-language films
Films about kidnapping
Films about beauty queens
Films directed by John Pasquin
Films with screenplays by Marc Lawrence
Films produced by Sandra Bullock
Films set in the Las Vegas Valley
Films shot in New York (state)
Films shot in the Las Vegas Valley
Village Roadshow Pictures films
Warner Bros. films
2000s female buddy films
2000s American films